Salustiano Jerônimo dos Reis, Baron of Camaquã was a 19th-century Brazilian Marshal. He participated in several wars, notably in his participation in the Paraguayan War as he played a major role during the Battle of Ytororó.

Biography
Salustiano was born on January 25, 1822, at Cisplatina as the son of Portuguese Brigadier General Salustiano Severino dos Reis and Isabel Tomásia Thompson. He married Plácida Elvira Teixeira Fernandes at Caçapava in 1844.

He began his military career in 1837, participating in the Ragamuffin War and the Platine War. During the Paraguayan War, he played an important role in the Battle of Itororó. During the Battle of Tuyuti he lost his son, Salustio, who was his aide-de-camp as he commanded the 14th Brigade of the 6th Division during the battle. When he arrived back to Porto Alegre, the Chamber of Deputies of the city dedicated to name a street after him as homage for his services on March 28, 1876. He ended his military career as a marshal. 

He was commander of the arms of Rio Grande do Sul several times and was also commander of the 6th Military District.

References

Bibliography

1822 births
1893 deaths
Marshals of Brazil
Brazilian military personnel of the Paraguayan War
Brazilian military personnel killed in action
People from Porto Alegre

Brazilian nobility